Lucas Rodríguez (born February 8, 1986 in Buenos Aires) is an Argentine former professional footballer who is currently an assistant coach with the Kansas City Current in the National Women's Soccer League.

Career

College and amateur
Rodríguez spent his early childhood up in his native Argentina, before coming to the United States when he was 14 years old, settling in Lenexa, Kansas and played in this time for the KC Pace soccer club. He attended Shawnee Mission Northwest High School, and after attending Johnson County Community College for two years, moved to MidAmerica Nazarene University in Olathe, Kansas. He played two more years of college soccer at Mid America Nazarene, where in his senior year Rodríguez led his team to the Heart of America Athletic Conference championship while being named the most valuable player, and garnering first- and third-team All-America honors.

During his college years Rodríguez also played with Kansas City Brass in the USL Premier Development League.

Professional
Undrafted out of college, Rodríguez signed his first professional contract in 2010 when he was signed by the NSC Minnesota Stars of the USSF Division 2 Professional League in May. He made his professional debut on July 14, 2010 in a game against AC St. Louis, and scored his first professional goal on September 24, 2010 in Minnesota's last regular season game of the 2010 season, a 3-1 win over FC Tampa Bay.

Rodríguez signed with the Kansas City Comets of the Major Indoor Soccer League (MISL) for the 2010-2011 season.  He played in 17 games scoring six goals and seven assists.  His play was good enough to earn him the MISL Rookie of the Year award.

He signed with Jacksonville Armada FC on October 23, 2014. Rodriguez was released by Jacksonville in November 2015.

Rodríguez returned to the Kansas City Comets of the new Major Arena Soccer League (MASL) for the 2016-17 season. He announced his retirement in December 2020.

Coaching
Rodríguez joined the coaching staff of National Women's Soccer League club Kansas City Current in January 2021, ahead of their inaugural season. He was retained by the Current for the 2022 NWSL season.

References

External links
 Minnesota Stars bio
 MASL bio

1986 births
Living people
Argentine footballers
Argentine expatriate footballers
Kansas City Brass players
Minnesota United FC (2010–2016) players
Missouri Comets players
Expatriate soccer players in the United States
USL League Two players
USSF Division 2 Professional League players
North American Soccer League players
Major Indoor Soccer League (2008–2014) players
Jacksonville Armada FC players
Johnson County Community College people
People from Lenexa, Kansas
Association football midfielders
Major Arena Soccer League players
Soccer players from Kansas
Sportspeople from the Kansas City metropolitan area
Kansas City Current non-playing staff
Footballers from Buenos Aires